Brachycythara galae is a species of sea snail, a marine gastropod mollusk in the family Mangeliidae.

Description
The length of the shell attains 11 mm.

Distribution
B. galae can be found in the Caribbean Sea, ranging from the coast of Louisiana to Quintana Roo. and the Gulf of Mexico
.

References

 Fargo, William G. The Pliocene Turridae of Saint Petersburg, Florida. 1953.
 Rosenberg, G., F. Moretzsohn, and E. F. García. 2009. Gastropoda (Mollusca) of the Gulf of Mexico, pp. 579–699 in Felder, D.L. and D.K. Camp (eds.), Gulf of Mexico–Origins, Waters, and Biota. Biodiversity. Texas A&M Press, College Station, Texas

External links
 

galae